Benjamin João Ucuahamba (born April 27, 1965), better known as Benjamin Avô, is a former Angolan basketball player.  He was listed at 6’0” and 180 pounds.

See also
 Angola national basketball team

References

External links
 
 AfricaBasket profile
 Proballers profile

1965 births
Living people
Angolan men's basketball players
Atlético Petróleos de Luanda basketball players
Basketball players at the 1992 Summer Olympics
Basketball players at the 1996 Summer Olympics
Olympic basketball players of Angola
Point guards
Basketball players from Luanda
1994 FIBA World Championship players